The 2013 Banca dell’Adriatico Tennis Cup was a professional tennis tournament played on clay courts. It was the ninth edition of the tournament which was part of the 2013 ATP Challenger Tour. It took place in San Benedetto del Tronto, Italy between 8 and 14 July 2013.

Singles main draw entrants

Seeds

 1 Rankings are as of June 24, 2013.

Other entrants
The following players received wildcards into the singles main draw:
  Daniele Giorgini
  Potito Starace
  Stefano Travaglia

The following players received entry as special exempt:
  Pere Riba
  Thomas Fabbiano

The following players received entry from the qualifying draw:
  Reda El Amrani
  Alessandro Giannessi
  Norbert Gombos
  Maxime Teixeira

The following player received entry as lucky loser:
  David Souto

Champions

Singles

 Andrej Martin def.  João Sousa 6–4, 6–3

Doubles

  Pierre-Hugues Herbert /  Maxime Teixeira def.  Alessandro Giannessi /  João Sousa 6–4, 6–3

External links
Official Website

Banca dell'Adriatico Tennis Cup
ATP Challenger San Benedetto